The Race of Two Worlds (Trofeo dei Due Mondi in Italian), also known as the 500 Miglia di Monza (500 Miles of Monza), was an automobile race held at the Autodromo Nazionale Monza, Italy in 1957 and again in 1958.  It was intended as an exhibition event, allowing American teams from the United States Auto Club (USAC) National Championship to compete directly against teams from the Formula One World Championship based in Europe.  The two types of cars competed on the banked oval at Monza which had been completed in 1955.  Due to the similarity to the Indianapolis Motor Speedway, where the USAC teams ran the Indianapolis 500, the event earned the nickname Monzanapolis.

American drivers and teams won the event in both the years in which it was run.  Jimmy Bryan won the 1957 event, while Jim Rathmann swept the 1958 race.  Although some Formula One teams did participate and even built special cars specifically for the event, several withdrew over safety concerns.  Continued concern over the speeds on the track and the cost of the event led to the race being canceled after the 1958 running.

Initial concept
In 1954, redevelopment of the Autodromo Nazionale Monza circuit began for the first time since 1948, concentrating on rebuilding the oval portion of the track which had been abandoned during World War II. The  banked oval, which had last been used in 1933, was dismantled. Both banked corners were rebuilt on a curving gradient which reached 80 degrees, replacing the flat banking which had been previously used. The reconstruction was completed in August 1955, in time for the Formula One Italian Grand Prix, which combined the new oval with the Monza road course for a full .

The following year, Giuseppe Bacciagaluppi, then president of the Automobile Club of Milan and chairman of the Autodromo Nazionale Monza, invited Duane Carter, competition director of USAC, to attend the second running of the Italian Grand Prix on the new circuit.  The two discussed the similarities between Monza's new oval and the Indianapolis Motor Speedway, which also held a round of the 1957 Formula One season, the Indianapolis 500.  Although the 500 counted as part of the championship, only a few Europeans attempted to participate in the event since the formation of the World Championship.  Ferrari's Alberto Ascari in 1952 was the only European competitor to actually qualify for the race.  Bacciagaluppi and Carter believed that an oval race held in Europe instead of the United States could attract Formula One teams, and USAC and the Automobile Club of Italy began work on making such an event possible.

A race was scheduled for June 1957, running just the 4.25 km oval at Monza. Volunteering USAC teams were to be transported from the United States, while Formula One teams were also free to participate if they chose. In preparation, Firestone Tire and Rubber Company transported a USAC Kurtis Kraft–Chrysler to Monza in April 1957 in order to conduct tests on tyres made for the event.

Format
The rules for the race were based on those used by USAC in North America. A USAC rolling start was also used, instead of Formula One's usual standing start. However, unlike Indianapolis, the 500 miles would not be run continuously. Instead, three separate 63-lap heats were planned, with an hour break for repairs and rest between each heat, for a total of approximately 500 miles. The overall race winner would be determined by the driver which finished all three heats with the highest average speed. The circuit would be run in an anti-clockwise direction, the same used at Indianapolis, but opposite the direction used by Formula One at Monza.

1957

The inaugural running of the Race of Two Worlds was scheduled for Sunday, June 29, shortly after the running of the Indianapolis 500, and a few weeks before the running of the French Grand Prix.  USAC's entries in the event traveled from Indianapolis to New York City, whence they were shipped to Genoa.  The drivers and personnel traveled separately from their cars, arriving by plane.  The teams and equipment were then transported from Genoa to Monza, where teams began practice on Tuesday the 18th.

Entrants

Fifteen cars were entered for the event.  Ten cars traveled across the Atlantic from USAC, while only two teams arrived with Formula One equipment.  Mario Bornigia used a privateer Ferrari, while Maserati entered their factory driver Jean Behra.  The rest of the Formula One teams however chose to boycott the event.  The Union des Pilotes Professionnels Internationaux (International Union of Professional Pilots), which had been formed only a few months prior, cited the dangers of the speeds able to be obtained on the Monza banking and the wear on tires posing threats to safety.  A further three entries arrived from the World Sportscar Championship, thanks to the Scottish Ecurie Ecosse Jaguar team, who had just won the 24 Hours of Le Mans the weekend before.

Practice and qualifying

Although several American teams ran laps on Tuesday, official practice did not begin until Wednesday. All drivers in attendance passed, and began to set their cars for top speed. Eddie Sachs led the first day's practice with a lap time of 56.4 seconds, one of few drivers to lap under a minute. On Thursday, Maserati arrived to enter Jean Behra in the event, but the two cars which Behra practiced with suffered handling problems when they were fitted with larger diameter Firestone tyres, recording a best lap time of 1:03.2 in the team's Formula One car. Maserati chose to not return the following day, joining the already withdrawn Ferrari, and leaving the race without any Formula One machinery.

Qualification was held on Friday, and the USAC teams continued to lower their lap times. Eight other USAC cars also qualified, with Paul Russo in the other Novi Special suffering a terminal flywheel failure during its qualification attempt and withdrawing. The three Ecurie Ecosse Jaguars also qualified, but all slower than the USAC entries, due in part to being limited to their Dunlop road racing tyres, which were smaller than the Firestones. The best Ecurie Ecosse time was earned by Jack Fairman, lapping in 59.8 seconds.

Race

Heat one
The first heat started on Sunday, with temperatures at the circuit reaching .  Bettenhausen slowly led the field to the starting line where an official waved the Italian flag to begin the race.  The trio of Jaguars, although starting at the back, managed to jump to an early lead due to their use of a four-speed gearbox, allowing them to out-accelerate the USAC roadsters with two-speed gearboxes.  Fairman led the first of 63 laps before the roadsters were able to build enough speed to catch and eventually pass the Jaguars.  Bettenhausen returned to the front of the field, but was forced to relinquish the lead during the fourth lap with a broken throttle linkage.  Pat O'Connor and Jimmy Bryan moved to the front and traded off the lead for half of the heat.

Bryan eventually took command of the lead, pulling away from O'Connor and followers Eddie Sachs and Andy Linden.  By the end of the 63 laps, Bryan was leading O'Connor by three seconds, with Linden the only other driver finishing on the lead lap.  Bettenhausen, having rejoined the race after repairing the throttle linkage, was the only retirement after a sway bar broke on Lap 45.  The USAC entries dominated, earning the first seven positions.  Only Bob Veith's Phillips-Offy was unable to finish ahead of the trio of Jaguars.

Heat two
Following an hour of repairs, the field began a rolling start for the second heat.  In preparation for the Jaguar's ability to accelerate at the start, the lead USAC entries attempted to block the front stretch by running alongside one another.  Troy Ruttman took the early lead, followed closely by O'Connor, Sachs, Bryan, and the Jaguar of Fairman.  O'Connor soon retired with a broken fuel tank, followed several laps later by Sachs with broken cam house bolts.  Ruttman was eventually caught and passed by Bryan, and the two finished in first and second at the end of the 63 laps.  Only seven cars were still running at the end of the race, including the three Jaguars running in fifth, sixth, and seventh places.

Heat three
Another hour for repairs allowed for O'Connor to repair his fuel tank, bringing the entry to eight cars for the final heat.  Only seven managed to begin the rolling start, as Ray Crawford remained in his pits to finish repairs.  Bryan and Ruttman took the early lead once again as O'Connor was once again forced to retire, his repairs to the fuel tank not holding up to the bumps of the Monza banking.  Jack Fairman's Jaguar managed to lead Johnnie Parsons' Kuzma-Offy early, but eventually the three remaining USAC cars led the three Jaguars to the finish line.  Ruttman finished ahead of Bryan, while Fairman once more led the Jaguar trio.

Final result
With two heat wins, and being the only driver to complete all 189 laps, Jimmy Bryan was declared the winner in front of a crowd of 20,000.  For his victory, he won US$35,000 in prize money, as well as a unique trophy created for the event.  Bryan averaged  over the full race distance, making it the fastest race in history, while Tony Bettenhausen also earned a world record by recording a lap speed of  breaking a closed circuit speed record.

1958
Following a successful running of the first Race of Two Worlds, the Automobile Club of Italy and USAC announced a second running in 1958, to be held on Sunday, June 29.  Several Formula One teams, impressed by the speeds achieved by the USAC teams but also enticed by the large prize sum, promised to attend the event.  Ferrari, initially reluctant, entered their own team after the Automobile Club of Italy announced that the Race of Two Worlds was a required event for teams vying for club's cash award for most successful Italian constructor.

Once again, USAC teams were transported from New York City on ships shortly after the Indianapolis 500.  Alfa Romeo provided trucks for transport of the teams once they arrived in Genoa.

Entrants

Once again, ten drivers and cars traveled from the United States to represent USAC. A further two USAC cars were also in attendance, to be driven by Formula One drivers Juan Manuel Fangio and Maurice Trintignant, but set up and run by the American crews. Ferrari, as part of their requirement with the Automobile Club of Italia, brought two unique cars. The first was an older 375 F1 chassis using a modified  V12 engine from 335 S sports car, and renamed the 412 MI. Luigi Chinetti's new North American Racing Team also entered a third Ferrari in the event, using an older V12 car which had originally attempted to qualify for the 1952 Indianapolis 500. Ferrari also chose to use the Firestone tires which USAC teams used, rather than the Englebert tires the company had a contract with.

Maserati also built a custom car, their only entry in the event.  Based on the design of USAC's cars, the car (designated the 420M/58) featured an alcohol-fueled V8 engine which was placed off-center to counteract centripetal force of running on an oval.  Learning from their problems the previous year, the car was specifically designed to use the larger Firestone tyres.  A two-speed gearbox was also used.  The Italian Eldorado Ice Cream Company helped fund the effort and so the entire car was painted white with their logo written across the side.

Jaguar also had a custom-built car entered, thanks to Lister Cars.  A Lister sports car chassis was purchased by the team, modified into a single-seater body style, and fitted with a Jaguar Straight-6 engine from the D-Type.  The bodywork was aluminium, and remained unpainted for the event, giving it a near mirror finish.  Dunlop tyres remained on the front, but the rear was adapted to handle the larger Firestone tyres.  The team also entered two standard Jaguar D-Types as they had done the previous year, although these were also altered to adapt to Monza's oval.  Air scoops were added to the rear fenders in an attempt to help keep the cars' Dunlop tyres from overheating.

Practice and qualifying

Juan Manuel Fangio started practice early by setting one of the first laps around the circuit on Wednesday in a USAC entry loaned to him.

Qualifying began on a dry track late on Friday, with Fangio once again setting early laps, and increasing his pace to record a 55.2 second lap. Luigi Musso recorded the fastest time for the European entries, with a 55.3 second lap in a 412 MI. Qualifying continued again on Saturday, with the Americans quickly jumping to the top of the time charts. Veith qualified second, and Fangio ended the day third. Stirling Moss' Maserati qualified eleventh, while Phil Hill's Ferrari was fourteenth. Masten Gregory led the Jaguar trio in sixteenth with the older D-Type.

Race

Heat one

Sunday was race day, once again running as three 63-lap heats.  Problems occurred early for Fangio as he was forced to withdraw from the first heat after his team discovered that his Offenhauser engine had a cracked piston.  The other eighteen cars took the rolling start and, as in the year before, the Jaguars' gearing allowed them to jump to the early lead before Ferrari's Musso and several USAC drivers reclaimed it before the end of the first lap of the race.  Eddie Sachs and Musso traded off the lead over the next several laps before Sachs remained in the lead, Jimmy Bryan also slipping into second.  Rathmann worked his way through the field and took the lead from Sachs on Lap 11.  Sachs was forced to drop from second place a few laps later when he broke a connecting rod, giving second to Musso.  Musso however also dropped back after being overcome by methanol fumes, pitting on Lap 27 and handing the car to Mike Hawthorn.  Rathmann continued to lead until the finish, followed by Bryan, Veith, and the Moss Maserati in fourth.  Musso, who returned to his Ferrari on the final lap, brought the car home in sixth, three laps behind.

Heat two
Heat two began with 13 of the 14 cars which had completed the first heat, Masten Gregory chose to not return with the Jaguar, but Rodger Ward was able to repair his car and compete.  Fangio planned to race, but his team had not completed engine repairs by the end of the hour and a half break.  Maurice Trintignant, who had completed the first heat in the Sclavi & Amos Kuzma-Offenhauser, chose to be relieved by rookie A. J. Foyt for the rest of the race.  Rathmann led the field to the start and remained in the lead throughout.  Musso once again remained with the top drivers, but pitted after only nineteen laps to be replaced, this time by Phil Hill whose Ferrari had retired in the first heat.  Moss, Veith, Bryan, and Troy Ruttman all fought for second place, eventually led to the finish by Veith, nearly 20 seconds behind winner Rathmann.  Moss' Maserati suffered engine trouble and dropped back at the finish, earning fifth.

Heat three

Eleven cars were entered for the final heat, joined by Fangio and Gregory who had both repaired their cars.  Fairman chose not to continue in the Lister-Jaguar, while Hawthorn started the #12 Ferrari in place of Musso.  Rathmann once again led at the start, followed by Bryan and Foyt.  Fangio's car lasted only two laps before his fuel pump failed and he was forced to retire.  Hawthorn suffered the same methanol inhalation problems as Musso and relinquished his car to Phil Hill after 24 laps.  Moss, after bringing his Maserati up to fourth place, suffered steering failure on Lap 41, crashing into the guard rails at the top of the banking.  Rathmann led straight to the finish, ahead of Bryan.  Hill brought the Ferrari up to third before giving the car back to Hawthorn, who finished the race in third.

Final result
Jim Rathmann, winning all three heats, was declared the race winner, although Jimmy Bryan had finished only a minute and a half behind Rathmann on aggregate time. Several thousand more spectators attending the 1958 running of the event than had attended the previous year.

Cancellation

Although the Race of Two Worlds attracted several European teams over its two years, the Automobile Club of Milan was unable to make a profit on the event.  Unable to agree on funding a third running, the Club did not organize a Race of Two Worlds for 1959 and the event never returned.  The banked oval at Monza remained part of the full Formula One circuit until 1961, and ceased to be used for any motorsports activities in 1969.  It has since been abandoned and left to decay, and at times threatened with demolition.

References

Notes

 Maserati provided a 250F Formula One car and a 450S sportscar for Behra.  He drove both during practice.
 Jim Rathmann served as a reserve driver for the John Zink Watson-Offy.  He practiced, but did not race.
 The #2 Lister-Jaguar ran Dunlop tyres on the front of the car and Firestone on the rear.
 Mike Hawthorn was assigned to drive the #12 Ferrari, but fell ill and Luigi Musso ran during the race.  Hawthorn and Hill drove the car as relief drivers for Musso.
 Luigi Musso was originally assigned to drive the #14 Ferrari, but when Musso moved to the #12 Ferrari, Phil Hill served as a replacement.
 Maurice Trintignant chose to not continue after the first heat, and A. J. Foyt took his place in the car.

External links
 8W - When? - The Race of Two Worlds
 John Starkey Cars - The Race of Two Worlds
 Dennis David - The Race of Two Worlds 1957-1958
 Champ Car Stats - Autodromo Nazionale di Monza
 Race of Two Worlds Monza - Video Retrieved May 23, 2010

Auto races in Italy